Patrick J. Garvan (1928 - 23 February 2021) was an Irish hurler who played for Kilkenny Senior Championship club Dicksboro and at inter-county level with the Kilkenny senior hurling team. He usually lined out at midfield.

Career

Garvan first played hurling with the Dicksboro club. He was a member of the club's senior team that beat Éire Óg to win the 1950 Kilkenny SHC title. It was around this time that Garvan joined the Kilkenny senior hurling team. He made 15 championship appearances and was a non-playing substitute when Kilkenny beat Waterford to win the All-Ireland Championship title in [[1957 1957. Garvan also won three Leinster Championship medals.

Death

Garvan died at his residence in Ballycallan, County Kilkenny on 23 February 2021, aged 92.

Honours

Dicksboro
Kilkenny Senior Hurling Championship: 1950

Kilkenny
All-Ireland Senior Hurling Championship: 1957
Leinster Senior Hurling Championship: 1950, 1953, 1957
Oireachtas Cup: 1957

References

1928 births
2021 deaths
Dicksboro hurlers
Kilkenny inter-county hurlers